Lasiocera is a genus of beetles in the family Carabidae, containing the following species:

 Lasiocera analava Alluaud, 1917 
 Lasiocera asmara Basilewsky, 1962 
 Lasiocera coromandelica Maindron, 1906 
 Lasiocera corrugata Basilewsky, 1963 
 Lasiocera egregia Peringuey, 1896 
 Lasiocera gracilis Boheman, 1848 
 Lasiocera malabarica Maindron, 1906 
 Lasiocera mirei Basilewsky, 1970 
 Lasiocera nitidula Dejean, 1831 
 Lasiocera orientalis Chaudoir, 1850  
 Lasiocera peringueyi Kuntzen, 1899 
 Lasiocera somalica Basilewsky, 1948 
 Lasiocera tesselata Klug, 1853

References

Lebiinae